Andrew Charles Cook (born 10 August 1969) is an English former professional footballer who played as a left-back and who is now the physiotherapist at National League side Eastleigh.

Playing career
After playing for Halterworth and Mountbatten school teams, Cook gained representative honours for Eastleigh and Winchester Schools, and Hampshire Schools, before signing as a trainee at Southampton in 1985. He signed full professional terms in July 1987, and made his full first-team debut at home to Manchester United on 15 August that year.

Having only played 22 first-team games in all competitions, and scoring one goal, and failing to settle into a regular first-team slot at either left-back or left-midfield, Cook signed for Exeter City (then managed by former Southampton player Alan Ball) in September 1991  for a fee of about £50,000.
  
Cook's nomadic career has subsequently taken him to Swansea City, Portsmouth, Millwall, and, lastly, Salisbury City.

Career as physiotherapist
He retired at the end of the 2005–06 season, becoming Salisbury's Football in the Community Officer. He then became manager of the club's reserve team before becoming part of City's physio staff.

In Summer 2008, he left Salisbury to become Woking's physio and also registering as a player. Following the departure of Kim Grant as manager, he was briefly joint caretaker boss of Woking with Phil Gilchrist.

In 2009, Cook joined Conference South side Eastleigh as a physio.

Career statistics

References

External links

1969 births
Living people
People from Romsey
English footballers
Association football fullbacks
Southampton F.C. players
Exeter City F.C. players
Swansea City A.F.C. players
Millwall F.C. players
Portsmouth F.C. players
Salisbury City F.C. players
Woking F.C. players
English Football League players